The Mari Mari Group is an Eifelian to Frasnian geologic group of the Amazon Basin in the state of Amazonas of northwestern Brazil. The group comprises shales and sandstones.

Fossil content 
The formation has provided fossils of Tentaculites sp., foraminifera and ostracods.

References

Bibliography 
 

Geologic groups of South America
Geologic formations of Brazil
Devonian System of South America
Devonian Brazil
Eifelian Stage
Shale formations
Sandstone formations
Devonian south paleopolar deposits
Devonian southern paleotemperate deposits
Paleontology in Brazil
Formations